is an inclined near-Earth object of the small Atira group from the innermost region of the Solar System, estimated to measure  in diameter. Among the hundreds of thousands known asteroids, 's orbit was thought to have likely the smallest semi-major axis (0.589 AU) and aphelion (0.77 AU), that is, the orbit's average distance and farthest point from the Sun, respectively. The object was first observed on 4 January 2019, by astronomers at Palomar's Zwicky Transient Facility in California, with recovered images dating back to 2015.

The record for smallest semi-major axis was beaten by another asteroid, with 0.555 AU.

Orbit and classification 

 orbits the Sun at a distance of 0.40–0.77 AU once every 5 months (165 days; semi-major axis of 0.589 AU). Its orbit has an eccentricity of 0.31 and an inclination of 47° with respect to the ecliptic. The body's observation arc begins with a precovery taken by Pan-STARRS at Haleakala Observatory in October 2015, more than 3 years prior to its official first observation at the Zwicky Transient Facility on 4 January 2019. It has a minimum orbit intersection distance with Earth of 0.22 AU or 88 lunar distances.

Aphelion 

 orbit has the third-smallest aphelion of any known asteroid in the Solar System, never distancing itself more than 0.774 AU from the Sun (77% of Earth's average orbital distance).

Atira class 

 is a member of the small class of Atira asteroids, which are also known as Apoheles or interior-Earth objects, as their orbits are confined inside that of Earth's. This makes their discovery difficult, as they stay relatively close to the Sun when observed from Earth, never reaching a Solar elongation of more than 90°, often much less. Only 19 such asteroids are known, 14 of which still reach 90% Earth's distance from the Sun over the course of their orbit.

Inclination 

The asteroid's orbit is also highly inclined with respect to the plane of the Solar System, at more than 47°, the highest inclination of any known Atira asteroid, although there are many near-Earth asteroids with even higher inclinations.

Perturbations 

On the short-term,  has a fairly quickly-changing orbit. Between 1600 AD and 2500 AD its aphelion distance lowers slightly from 0.7746 to 0.7725 AU, its perihelion distance increases slightly from 0.4025 to 0.4046 AU, and its inclination increases slightly from 47.19 to 47.25°. It is not subjected to a Kozai resonance because although its eccentricity and inclination oscillate in synchrony (when the eccentricity reaches its maximum value, the inclination is at its lowest and vice versa) over a long period of time, the value of the argument of perihelion circulates; the Earth-Moon system and Jupiter are its dominant perturbers.

Numbering and naming 

As of 2019, this minor planet has neither been numbered nor named by the Minor Planet Center.

Physical characteristics 

The Minor Planet Center also considers  to be larger than 1 kilometer. However, these are estimates with apparently no published measurement confirming the body's diameter. Based on a generic magnitude-to-diameter conversion, the asteroid could measure anywhere between 500 meters and 2 kilometers for an extreme albedo of 0.45 (brighter than the E-types of the Hungaria population) and 0.04 (very dark carbonaceous D- and P-types of some members in the Hildian and Jupiter trojan population), respectively. As of 2019, less than 900 large (kilometer-sized) near-Earth asteroids have been discovered.

References

External links 
 
 
 

Minor planet object articles (unnumbered)
20190104